Duga Resa is a town in Karlovac County, Croatia. It is located about 65 km southwest of Zagreb and 100 km east of Rijeka.

Name

The earliest reference to Duga Resa is from the year 1380. There are several theories on how the then-village acquired its name: one is that "resa" is a reference to the town people's folk costumes; another is that it is named from a native plant that grows in the area, both on the land and in the water.

Population

The village soon grew into a town during the industrialization of the area in the late 19th and early 20th century. In the 2001 census, there were 12,114 inhabitants in the municipality, 96% of which were Croats.

In 2011, the total population is 11,180, in the following settlements:

 Belajska Vinica, population 180
 Belavići, population 305
 Bošt, population 62
 Cerovački Galovići, population 62
 Donje Mrzlo Polje Mrežničko, population 512
 Donji Zvečaj, population 165
 Duga Resa, population 6,011
 Dvorjanci, population 123
 Galović Selo, population 74
 Gorica, population 62
 Gornje Mrzlo Polje Mrežničko, population 617
 Grganjica, population 17
 Gršćaki, population 77
 Kozalj Vrh, population 91
 Lišnica, population 183
 Mihalić Selo, population 81
 Mrežničke Poljice, population 114
 Mrežnički Brig, population 270
 Mrežnički Novaki, population 188
 Mrežnički Varoš, population 904
 Mrežničko Dvorište, population 67
 Novo Brdo Mrežničko, population 119
 Pećurkovo Brdo, population 101
 Petrakovo Brdo, population 120
 Sveti Petar Mrežnički, population 163
 Šeketino Brdo, population 181
 Venac Mrežnički, population 131
 Zvečaj, population 203

Local interests
Popular activities include fishing, rafting, hunting, boating, swimming, volleyball, soccer, and biking. The local churches St. Antun in Duga Resa and St. Peters (Sveti Petar) dates back to the 14th century.

Its geographic location gives the town very hot summers and very cold winters.

Notable people
Antun Stipančić - table tennis player
Miroslav Šutej - visual artist and designer of Croatian coat of arms

References

External links

 

Cities and towns in Croatia
Populated places in Karlovac County
14th-century establishments in Croatia
1380 establishments in Europe